Batrak is a rural locality (a selo) in Novoursayevsky Selsoviet, Bakalinsky District, Bashkortostan, Russia. The population was 39 as of 2010. There is 1 street.

Geography 
Batrak is located 46 km west of Bakaly (the district's administrative centre) by road. Nagaybakovo is the nearest rural locality.

References 

Rural localities in Bakalinsky District